Darreh Mari-ye Babakan (also Romanized as Darreh Mārī-ye Bābakān; also known as Darreh Mārī) is a village in Sepidar Rural District, in the Central District of Boyer-Ahmad County, Kohgiluyeh and Boyer-Ahmad Province, Iran. At the 2006 census, its population was 128, in 22 families.

References 

Populated places in Boyer-Ahmad County